Creepy Canada is a Canadian television series that aired on OLN. It focused on paranormal activities around Canada. The show first premiered on October 23, 2002 and began its third season on May 5, 2006. With the third season, the show's scope was expanded to include paranormal activity reported in the United States. It was originally hosted by Terry Boyle, and was later hosted by Brian O'Dea, who was also the producer of the show.

Creepy Canada's last episode aired on July 28, 2006; the show has stopped producing new episodes.

In 2014, Destination America aired the series under an alternate title called Hauntings and Horrors.

Episode list

Season 1 (2002)

Season 2 (2003-2004)

Season 3 (2006)

References

External links
 
 
 

2000s Canadian reality television series
2002 Canadian television series debuts
2006 Canadian television series endings
2000s Canadian documentary television series
Paranormal television
Destination America original programming